Girvan Academy is a secondary school in Girvan, Scotland run by South Ayrshire Council.

The Head Teacher until the end of session 2020–21 was Elaine Harrigan. In 2021, Mark Anderson was appointed as Head Teacher.

History
In the early 1800s there were two schools in Girvan: the Burgh School and the Parish School, which was also known as the Parochial or Grammar School at different times in its history. Around 1812, the two schools merged to form Girvan Higher Grade School which later became Girvan High School, subsequently renamed as Girvan Academy.

The present building was completed in 1988.

In 2017 the school launched a horticultural and rural skills programme.

References

External links

 
 

Secondary schools in South Ayrshire
Girvan